Earl Jerrod "E. J." Rowland (born May 18, 1983) is an American-born Bulgarian professional basketball player for GTK Gliwice of the Polish Basketball League (PLK).

College career
Rowland began his college career with CSU Dominguez Hills. As a freshman with the Toros, he averaged 9.8 points, 4.6 rebounds, and 2.3 assists while starting 24 of 27 games.  Following this season, he transferred to Hartnell College, a two-year community college in Salinas, California.  In his only season with the team, he led the squad in points, assists, steals, and free-throw percentage en route to being named Coast Conference Player of the Year and earning All-State honors.

Rowland finished his college career with two years of NCAA basketball at St. Mary's (CA).  He had two successful seasons with the Gaels, leading the team in assists in both his years there.  Following his senior season, he earned honorable mention All-WCC.

Professional career
Rowland began his professional career in the D-League with the Florida Flame.  After seeing little action off the bench for the team, he spent the 2005–06 season with Barons LMT in Latvia.  He then spent the 2006–07 season in Australia before landing with Artland Dragons of the Basketball Bundesliga in 2007. In 2008–09, he averaged 13.6 points and 3.4 assists per game for Telekom Baskets Bonn.  He helped the team to the finals of the Bundesliga for the second consecutive season. In July 2011 he signed a two-year deal with Unicaja Málaga in Spain. After unsuccessful season for himself and team, Unicaja decided to go another direction and loaned Rowland to Latvian champions VEF Rīga.

In Latvia E.J. had a break-out year leading his team to a great season, while Rowland got multiple individual awards. After such season Rowland moved to Turkey, signing lucrative deal with Banvit.

On January 7, 2015, in a EuroCup away game against Budućnost Podgorica, he was involved in an on-court incident. With two minutes of game time remaining, a hooligan ran onto the court, in order to hit Sammy Mejía of Banvit, after which Rowland punched the hooligan fan in retaliation. After the brawl, the referees ejected him from the court. He was fined by Euroleague Basketball (which organizes the EuroCup) for taking part in the incident, with a 30,000 euros fine.

On August 12, 2015, Rowland signed a one-year deal with the Israeli club Hapoel Jerusalem.

On August 23, 2016, Rowland signed with Russian club Khimki for the 2016–17 season.

On July 17, 2017, Rowland signed with Turkish club Eskişehir Basket for the 2017–18 season.

On February 1, 2019, he has signed with Montakit Fuenlabrada of Spanish Liga ACB.

On March 1, 2021, Rowland signed with Chemidor B.C. of the Iranian Basketball Super League.

On October 17, 2022, he has signed with GTK Gliwice of the Polish Basketball League (PLK).

National team career
Rowland was invited to try out for the one naturalized player spot on the senior Bulgarian national basketball team for EuroBasket 2009.  He beat out Andre Owens for the naturalized spot on the roster.  With the national team, he led all players at EuroBasket 2009 in minutes played, while averaging 17.7 points per game.  Despite his efforts, the Bulgarians finished 0–3 and were eliminated in the group stage.

Personal life
E.J. Rowland develops his personal project through his brand GRRR. The GRRR brand and apparel line has come to life through E.J., a few close friends and some fellow athletes as a reflection of their inner drive for greatness. It has resonated with people across all ages, nationalities, and career paths.

The Basketball Tournament
E.J. Rowland played for Team Challenge ALS in the 2018 edition of The Basketball Tournament. In four games, he averaged 6.8 points per game and 2.8 rebounds per game on 39 percent shooting. Team Challenge ALS made it to the West Regional Championship Game before falling to eventual tournament runner-up Eberlein Drive.

References

External links
 ACB.com Profile
 E. J. Rowland at euroleague.net
 E. J. Rowland at fiba.com
 E. J. Rowland at tblstat.net
 

1983 births
Living people
American expatriate basketball people in Australia
American expatriate basketball people in Germany
American expatriate basketball people in Israel
American expatriate basketball people in Italy
American expatriate basketball people in Latvia
American expatriate basketball people in Spain
American expatriate basketball people in Turkey
American men's basketball players
Artland Dragons players
Baloncesto Fuenlabrada players
Baloncesto Málaga players
Bandırma B.İ.K. players
Basketball players from California
BC Khimki players
BK Barons players
BK VEF Rīga players
Bulgarian expatriate basketball people in Germany
Bulgarian expatriate basketball people in Latvia
Bulgarian expatriate basketball people in Turkey
Bulgarian expatriate basketball people in Spain
Bulgarian men's basketball players
Bulgarian people of American descent
Eskişehir Basket players
Florida Flame players
Hapoel Jerusalem B.C. players
Hartnell Panthers men's basketball players
GTK Gliwice players
Liga ACB players
Naturalised citizens of Bulgaria
Point guards
Saint Mary's Gaels men's basketball players
Sportspeople from Salinas, California
Sydney Kings players
Telekom Baskets Bonn players
Townsville Crocodiles players
Vanoli Cremona players